Burago is a surname. Notable people with the surname include:

Aleksandr Burago ( 1853–1883), commander of the Russian Imperial army
Dmitri Burago (born 1964), Russian mathematician
Yuri Burago (born 1936), Soviet Russian mathematician

See also
Bburago, an Italian model car manufacturer